Breathe Carolina are an American electronic music duo from Denver, Colorado, currently composed of David Schmitt and Tommy Cooperman. The band formed in 2007 and have released five albums, and nine EPs. Their latest studio album, Dead: The Album, was released in November 2019.

History

Beginnings (2007)
Kyle Even, born on September 21, 1985, and David Schmitt, born on March 26, 1988, spent their early years playing in various local Colorado musical groups. After being introduced to alternative rock by an older stepbrother, Even moved towards vocals as a teen. Before joining Breathe Carolina, Even performed in the band Rivendale. They produced an extended play called Portrait of Shadows. Schmitt, on the other hand, started on bass at the age of 12 and then branched out to guitar, performing in Colorado with As the Flood Waters Rose (later named the Autobiography).

Both bands played together often. As the Flood Waters Rose opened up for Rivendale at Rivendale's album release at Grandpa's Music Box in Thornton. After leaving As the Flood Waters Rose, Schmitt started recording his own song on GarageBand, which he later asked Even to participate in creating. As both bands broke up for the members' departure for college, Even and Schmitt started Breathe Carolina.

Gossip and It's Classy, Not Classic (2007–2008)
Breathe Carolina started in 2007 with Even and Schmitt recording songs on the music-creating software GarageBand for fun. They created a Myspace profile, gaining over 10,000 song plays in 2008 and accumulating over 30 million plays during 2009. The name Breathe Carolina came from a dream that Schmitt had in 9th grade, about calming down a woman named Carolina. Soon afterwards, Even quit his job as a photographer to tour with the group full-time. Their first EP, Gossip, was released as an iTunes exclusive on November 26, 2007. It was self-released and has since been removed from the store.

Breathe Carolina recorded their first album using GarageBand, and signed with Rise Records before its release. The album introduced a few new songs that were not featured on Gossip, including "The Introduction", "No Vacancy", "Show Me Yours", "Classified", "That's Classy", and "You Wish". "Don't Forget: Lock The Door" was the only track from the Gossip EP that is not featured on the LP. The album was released on September 16, 2008, and was followed by a tour to promote the album. Breathe Carolina headlined their tour with Every Avenue, Brokencyde, and the Morning Of. While on "The Delicious Tour", they announced that they would be making a music video for "Diamonds". The video has appearances made by Millionaires, as well as Josh White from Umbrella Clothing and This City Is Burning Records.

Hello Fascination (2009–2010)

A few months after the release of Punk Goes Pop 2, shortly after they finished the 2009 "Take Action Tour", Breathe Carolina left Rise Records and signed with Fearless Records. On July 27, 2009, the second song from Hello Fascination was released, the title track of the album. Hello Fascination was released on August 18, 2009.

The deluxe edition of Hello Fascination was released on July 6. On June 23, Schmitt and Even launched a clothing line called Blush. "I.D.G.A.F." was released as a single, with the music video being released on July 30, 2010. The duo played on the Altec Lansing stage during Vans Warped Tour 2010 and covered the song "Down" by Jay Sean for the compilation album Punk Goes Pop 3 that was released on November 2, 2010.

On November 21, 2010, Breathe Carolina released their second ever Christmas-themed song for a part on the 'Tis the Season to Be Fearless compilation album. The song is titled "Mile-High Christmas".

Hell Is What You Make It (2010–2012)

Recording for the third studio album took place in early 2011. The album's first single, "Blackout", was available for streaming via MTV Buzzworthy on June 13, 2011, and was available for digital download the following day. On June 16, the duo performed "Blackout" for a nationwide television presentation on Jimmy Kimmel Live. A music video for the track was shot in Los Angeles, California on July 1 and 2, and was released on the duo's official Vevo page on YouTube on September 20.

The group participated on the Scream It Like You Mean It 2011 tour during that summer to promote the album. An extended play titled Blackout: The Remixes EP was released on September 27 via iTunes. In November 2011, the duo was named MTV Push Artist of the Week.

On December 23, 2011, it was announced that the duo signed with Columbia Records. Throughout early 2012, the duo participated in the Blackout Forever tour alongside the Ready Set with guest appearances by Ashland HIGH and Matt Toka. On February 22, it was announced that the duo would be participating in the 2012 Warped Tour. The duo have also since re-entered the studio to continue writing and recording new tracks. A new single, "Hit and Run", premiered via Alternative Press on May 21. The duo also contributed to the compilation album Punk Goes Pop 5 with their cover of Michael Jackson's "Billie Jean".

Savages, Acoustic, Thank You and style and lineup changes (2013–2016)
Breathe Carolina had finished working on their fourth studio album and had said that they were going back to their old roots for the record. On March 25, 2013, it was announced that the title of the new album is Savages. On July 6, 2013, the duo released their first mixtape Bangers for free download via Sol Republic. Following its release the band toured in North America with the Ready Set and rapper T. Mills.

On October 15, 2013, David Schmitt made an announcement via Alternative Press discussing founding member Kyle Even's departure from the band, due to his new responsibilities as a father.

The band later embarked on the "We are Savages Tour", touring with Jonny Craig, Mod Sun and Ghost Town. The band has released three singles from their album Savages, the title track as the first buzz single with a lyric video, "Sellouts" featuring Danny Worsnop from Asking Alexandria as the official lead, with a music video and "Bang It Out".

A music video of the song "Chasing Hearts" featuring Tyler Carter from metalcore band Issues was released on April 18, 2014, followed by another for the song "Collide" featuring clips from their album's release party in Los Angeles, California.

On April 15, 2014, Savages was released selling 14,000 copies in its first week, topping the Billboard Dance/Electronic Albums chart and peaked at No. 22 on the Billboard 200.

September 9, 2014, Breathe Carolina released a collaboration with Candyland, "Find Someone", on SoundCloud.

On June 9, 2015, the band released a single with producer Apek, titled "Anywhere But Home", on Zouk Recordings (now Armada Zouk).

On July 18, 2015, the band made an announcement via their Twitter page, stating a three-track EP, Acoustic, would be emailed as a free download to those who would buy their next single on August 31 from Beatport. The self-released EP comprised acoustic versions of the songs "Anywhere But Home", "Bury Me" and "Please Don't Say", the latter two being singles from Savages. On August 31, they released a collaboration with French duo Y&V, titled "Hero (Satellite)", on Oxygen Recordings, along with the EP.

On September 24, the band announced via their Twitter page that another self-released EP, titled Thank You, would be emailed as a free download to those buying their upcoming single from Beatport, in a similar way to that of Acoustic. On September 28, They released the single, titled "Platinum Hearts", featuring American singer KARRA, on Armada Trice, along with Thank You. The four-track EP comprised their cover of the Montell Jordan song "This Is How We Do It", an acoustic version of "Platinum Hearts", a dubstep edit of the song "Sellouts", and a mashup of the songs "I.D.G.A.F." and "Hero (Satellite)".

On November 20, 2015, the band released a single in collaboration with artist Ryos, featuring uncredited vocals from Karra, titled "More Than Ever", and was published by Dutch record label Spinnin' Records. On November 22, they announced on Twitter that a free two-track EP, titled More Than Ever: The Thank You EP, will be emailed to those who would send them a proof of the purchase for "More Than Ever" via email. The EP comprised the acoustic version of "More Than Ever" and a remix of "Anywhere But Home" by American DJ Landis.

On December 13, 2015, the duo released a collaboration with producer Shanahan, on UK-based Enhanced Music which featured American singer Haliene. The single went on to receive 2.5 million Spotify streams and enjoyed heavy rotation on BPM (Sirius XM) Dance radio. The track went on to be featured in "Enhanced Best of 2015", a compilation album released by Enhanced. It also peaked at no. 26 on the Billboard Dance/Mix Show Airplay chart.

On January 29, 2016, the band announced via their Twitter page about another free EP called Ruins: The Thank You EP, which they would email to the buyers of their upcoming single "Ruins", featuring Angelika Vee. On February 2, "Ruins" was released on Doorn Records. The four-track EP comprised three mashups made with their previously released songs, and a remix of "Anywhere But Home" by Mexican-American duo Skellism.

Sleepless, Oh So Hard (Part I and II) and Coma (2016–2018)
A new EP titled Sleepless was released on September 16, 2016. The first single off the EP was "See the Sky" with Jay Cosmic featuring Haliene. The second single was titled "Stable" with Crossnaders. It became the group's most successful EP as of now, peaking at no. 4 on the Billboard Dance/Electronic Albums chart and at no. 36 on the Billboard Independent Albums chart.

On November 25, 2016, They released a song titled "Echo (Let Go)", with IZII.

In late May 2017, a new track, "Glue" was previewed on the band's official Instagram page and a new EP was announced. Titled Coma, it was available for preorder on June 16, 2017, and the first single "Glue", was also released. Coma was released on July 14, 2017. It consisted of five tracks including the forementioned single. 

In 2018, the duo released a remix to the song "Happier" by Marshmello and Bastille.

Dead: The Album (2019–present)
The band released their fifth studio album, Dead: The Album, on November 15, 2019, on Spinnin' Records and Big Beat. "Too Good" was released on September 13, 2019, as the lead single from the album. The album also spawned two other singles: "Like This" and "Drive". One day before the album came out,"July" was released along with its music video. They also released an acoustic EP, Dead: The Acoustic and a remix album, Dead: The Remixes.

In 2019, Breathe Carolina released a remix to Smash Mouth's "All Star" to celebrate the 20th anniversary of the song.

Musical style and arrangement
Breathe Carolina has mainly been categorized as electropop, EDM
 and electronic rock. Post-hardcore influence also existed in the majority of earlier work by the band, evident by the use of screamed vocals and breakdowns. These elements, however, were usually kept to a minimum while electronic elements took precedence. This fusion of post-hardcore characteristics and dance-oriented electronica had once led the group to be labeled crunkcore as well. Also typical of crunkcore is the prevalent use of Auto-Tune and vocoders on Schmitt's vocals.

Their entire first EP, Gossip, and debut full-length album, It's Classy, Not Classic, were recorded using only the computer program GarageBand. The group did not produce music via studio until the recording of Hello Fascination, which can be considered the group's first true studio album.

Although much instrumentation is added through programming, typical instruments were also present in their music in select songs; Schmitt provided lead singing vocals for the duo along with playing the guitar and drums while Even provided unclean vocals and occasional cleans in their newer material. Live performances by Breathe Carolina usually consisted of an arrangement of three extra members providing keyboards, keytars, drums, guitars and bass. During most live sets, Joshua Aragon played guitar (when necessary) and performs backing vocals while Eric Armenta provided drums on a standard drum kit all while Schmitt and Even performed the clean and unclean vocal positions respectively.

Since the departure of Kyle Even and the addition of DJ/guitarist Tommy Cooperman, Breathe Carolina became a four piece band. Live performances consisted of the four members and occasional extra musicians like Michael Naran (currently in the Ready Set and Sparks the Rescue). When they performed the song "Sellouts" live, Breathe Carolina is joined by a screaming vocalist, usually the lead vocalist from another band, while Luis Bonet and Tommy Cooperman performed guitar parts. Tommy also performed screaming vocals for other songs, like "Hello Fascination" on tour and co-produced the songs.

After the departure of Bonet in 2015 and Armenta in 2017, Breathe Carolina is now a duo focusing mainly on a variety of styles within the EDM genre.

Controversies
On December 14, 2022, Breathe Carolina member Tommy Cooperman was arrested and charged for engaging in a $114 million "pump and dump" scheme along with several others by federal prosecutors. According to reports, Cooperman along with others, "allegedly engaged in a wide-ranging securities fraud conspiracy" in which the defendants used their social media presence on Twitter and Discord. The incident took place from around January 2020 to April 2022 and Cooperman was charged with two counts of securities fraud.

Members

Current members
David Schmitt – lead vocals, programming, production, guitars, bass, keyboards, synthesizer, drums, percussion (2007–present)
Tommy Cooperman – lead guitar, programming, production, unclean vocals, keyboards, synthesizer, bass (2013–present)

Former members
Kyle Even – unclean vocals, clean vocals, backing vocals, programming, guitars, bass (2007–2013)
Joshua Aragon – keyboards, lead guitar, bass, backing vocals (2007–2013 session and touring)
Luis Bonet – DJ, keyboards, programming, (2008–2013 session and touring, 2013–2015), guitar, bass (2013–2015)
Eric Armenta – drums, percussion, production (2008–2013 session and touring, 2013–2017)

Timeline

Discography

Studio albums
 It's Classy, Not Classic (2008)
 Hello Fascination (2009)
 Hell Is What You Make It (2011)
 Savages (2014)
 Dead: The Album (2019)

Awards and nominations

DJ Mag

Top 100 DJs

MTV Buzzworthy

Tours

Headlining
 Fearless Friends Tour (2010)
 The Spring Break Your Heart Tour (2011)
 Scream It Like You Mean It Tour (2011)
 We Are Savages Tour (2014)
 Dead: The Tour (2019)

Co-headlining
 Blackout Forever Tour  (2012)
 The Friend Zone Tour  (2014)

Opening act
 Feel This Tour  (2013)

References

External links

Breathe Carolina at Fearless Records

Musical groups from Denver
American electronic music duos
American electronic rock musical groups
Rise Records artists
Fearless Records artists
Crunkcore groups
Electronicore musical groups
Jewish musical groups
Musical groups established in 2007
Columbia Records artists
Electropop groups
Electronic music groups from Colorado
Electronic dance music duos